Yom (short for Yogendra Omprakash Mathur) is an Indian flash-animated television series produced by Graphiti Multimedia and created by Munjal Shroff. It premiered on 1 May 2017 on Disney Channel in India. Originally set to air in 2016, but Disney delayed it to May 2017. The story is about Yogendra Mathur, often shortened to Yom, an 11-year-old school boy who lives in Chotasheher and can transform to different animals by performing Yoga Asanas.

The show was added to Netflix on 7 June 2018.

Premise
Yogendra Mathur (Yom) is an 11-year-old schoolboy who has the power to transform into multiple animals like eagle, cat or dog; among others. He can only be in his animal form for 11 minutes at a time. He lives in the fictional city of Chotasheher and saves it from evil threats. His friend Riya is his timekeeper and tells him about how much time he has left in his animal form. She has a watch which alerts her when Yom transforms into an animal.

References

2017 Indian television series debuts
2017 Indian television series endings
Indian flash animated television series
Indian children's animated action television series
Indian children's animated fantasy television series
Indian children's animated superhero television series
Disney Channel (Indian TV channel) original programming
Animated television series about children
Animated television series about animals
Television series about shapeshifting